Ramjin Rural District is in Ramjin District of Chaharbagh County, Alborz province, Iran. It was formerly in Chaharbagh District of Savojbolagh County, Tehran province. At the census of 2006, its population was 16,960 in 4.294 households, and in the most recent census of 2016, it had increased to 23,348 in 7,347 households, by which time Savojbolagh County had become a part of the newly established Alborz province. The largest of its 23 villages was Lashkarabad, with 7,198 people.

References 

Rural Districts of Alborz Province

Populated places in Alborz Province